The Boskoop railway station is a railway station in Boskoop, Netherlands, located on the RijnGouweLijn between Gouda and Alphen aan den Rijn. The railway station was opened on 7 October 1934 to transport the products of the local horticultural nurseries.

Train services
The following train services call at Boskoop:
2x per hour local service (sprinter) Alphen aan den Rijn - Gouda
2x per hour local service (stoptrein) Leiden - Alphen aan den Rijn - Gouda (Peak hours only)

External links
NS website 
Dutch Public Transport journey planner 

Railway stations in South Holland
Railway stations opened in 1934
Alphen aan den Rijn
1934 establishments in the Netherlands
Railway stations in the Netherlands opened in the 20th century